The rehabilitation of Marawi began following the end of the Battle of Marawi in October 2017, which left the city of Marawi devastated. The five month-conflict which started in May 2017 saw government forces fighting against ISIL-affiliated militants led by Isnilon Hapilon of the Abu Sayyaf and Omar and Abdullah Maute of the Maute group.

History

Efforts to rehabilitate Marawi began even as the Battle of Marawi was still ongoing. An inter-agency taskforce called Task Force Bangon Marawi was set up on June 28, 2017, to facilitate the rehabilitation after the conflict subsides. The Philippine hosting of the regional 2019 Southeast Asian Games was initially cancelled in August 2017 with government funds meant for the hosting to be reallocated to the rehabilitation efforts. Two months later the government said that the country will remain as hosts.

The Department of the Interior and Local Government has announced that the rehabilitation efforts has already begun by October 18, 2017. By October 27, 2017, a few days after the conflict ended, the Armed Forces of the Philippines dissolved its Joint Task Force Marawi which marks the start of full-scale rehabilitation of Marawi. The military set up Joint Task Force Ranao to replace the defunct task force to facilitate the rehabilitation efforts.

The Philippine military started clearing unexploded ordnance after battle and has cleared around 85 percent of the ordnance by May 2018. Around 70 percent of the displaced residents of Marawi has returned to the city by this time.

In 2020, the chair of Task Force Bangon Marawi declared that 20%-30% of Marawi City had been rehabilitated. As of November 2020, some 2,800 families remain in temporary shelters. Five years after the siege, in May 2022, the 72% of Marawi City has been rehabilitated.

Finances

Projected cost

Budget

Foreign aid
Amidst the battle, some countries and international organization either pledged or gave aid for the rehabilitation of Marawi. China on its part gave a check donation as well as shipment of heavy equipment such as excavators, bulldozers, and dump trucks. India donated about Rs 3.2 crore for the rehabilitation and relief of Marawi.

The Asian Development Bank and World Bank expressed their willingness in providing technical assistance in regards to the rehabilitation of Marawi.

By October 2017, the Philippine government has received rehabilitation aid from Canada, China, Germany, India, South Korea, Singapore, Thailand. It has also received aid from the United States Agency for International Development and the ASEAN Coordinating Center for Humanitarian Assistance on Management. Australia, Japan, the United States, as well as the European Union and the United Nations Development Program have pledged aid.

Notes

References

History of Lanao del Sur
Marawi